Patrick Dunne was an American football fullback who played two seasons in the American Professional Football Association with the Detroit Heralds and Detroit Tigers

External links
Just Sports Stats
Fanbase profile

Year of death missing
American football fullbacks
Detroit Heralds players
Detroit Tigers (NFL) players
1890 births